Beiyinhe railway station is a railway station of Lafa–Harbin Railway and located in the Wuchang of Harbin, Heilongjiang province, China.

See also
Lafa–Harbin Railway

References

Railway stations in Heilongjiang
Railway stations in Harbin